The Commentarii Mathematici Helvetici is a quarterly peer-reviewed scientific journal in mathematics. The Swiss Mathematical Society started the journal in 1929 after a meeting in May of the previous year. The Swiss Mathematical Society still owns and operates the journal; the publishing is currently handled on its behalf by the European Mathematical Society. The scope of the journal includes research articles in all aspects in mathematics. The editors-in-chief have been Rudolf Fueter (1929–1949), J.J. Burckhardt (1950–1981), P. Gabriel (1982–1989), H. Kraft (1990–2005), and Eva Bayer-Fluckiger (2006–present).

Abstracting and indexing 
The journal is abstracted and indexed in:

According to the Journal Citation Reports, the journal has a 2019 impact factor of 0.854.

References

External links 
 

Mathematics journals
Publications established in 1929
English-language journals
Quarterly journals
European Mathematical Society academic journals